This is a list of some of the pig breeds considered in Italy to be wholly or partly of Italian origin. Some may have complex or obscure histories, so inclusion here does not necessarily imply that a breed is predominantly or exclusively Italian.

Principal breeds 

 Apulo-Calabrese, also Calabrese, Nero di Calabria, or Nero Calabrese
 Casertana, also Di Teano, Pelatella
 Cinta Senese
 Duroc Italiana
 Italian Landrace
 Large White Italiana
 Mora Romagnola
 Nero di Parma
 Nero Siciliano
 Pugliese
 Sarda

Minor and historic breeds 

 Abruzzese
 Basilicata
 Bastianella
 Bergamasca Nera
 Borghigiana
 Calabrese
 Catanzarese
 Chianina
 Cosentina
 Faentina
 Forlivese
 Friulana Nera
 Fumati
 Gargano
 Garlasco
 Lagonegrese
 Macchiaiola Maremmana
 Murgese
 Napoletana Fulva
 Nero dei Lepini
 Nero dei Monti Dauni Meridionali
 Nero Reatino
 Parmigiana Nera
 Perugina
 Reggitana
 Riminese
 Rossa Modenese
 Samólaco
 San Lazzaro
 Siciliano
 Suino delle Nebrodi e Madonie
 Valtellina

References

 List
Pig